The qualifying competition for the 1976 CONCACAF Men's Pre-Olympic Tournament determined the three teams for the final tournament.

Preliminary round

First round

Second round

References

CONCACAF Men's Olympic Qualifying Tournament
1976 in sports